Khalaj (also known as Khalach) is a village in Khorramdarreh Rural District, in the Central District of Khorramdarreh County, Zanjan Province, Iran. At the 2006 census, its population was 30, in 11 families.

References 

Populated places in Khorramdarreh County